

Paul Laux (11 November 1887 – 2 September 1944) was a German general in the Wehrmacht during World War II who commanded the 16th Army.  He was a recipient of the Knight's Cross of the Iron Cross with Oak Leaves of Nazi Germany.

Laux took command of the 10th Division in Passau. On 18 March some of these troops reached Vienna. In March 1939, when National Socialists and the 85th Infantry Regiment commemorated fallen heroes on the Passau Cathedral Square, Laux praised Adolf Hitler. Next, his men invaded Bohemia. On 13 April Laux commemorated the annexation of Austria in Passau.

As commanding officer of the 126th Infantry Division, Laux took part in Operation Barbarossa, the invasion of the Soviet Union. On 29 August 1944 Paul Laux crashed during a reconnaissance flight. He died of his injuries on 2 September 1944.

Awards 

 Clasp to the Iron Cross (1939) 2nd Class (January 1940) & 1st Class (July 1940)
 Knight's Cross of the Iron Cross with Oak Leaves
 Knight's Cross on 14 December 1941 as Generalleutnant and commander of 126. Infanterie-Division
 237th Oak Leaves on 17 May 1943 as General der Infanterie and commander of II Armeekorps

References

Citations

Bibliography

 
 

1887 births
1944 deaths
Military personnel from Weimar
Generals of Infantry (Wehrmacht)
German Army personnel of World War I
Recipients of the clasp to the Iron Cross, 1st class
Victims of aviation accidents or incidents in the Soviet Union
Recipients of the Knight's Cross of the Iron Cross with Oak Leaves
People from Saxe-Weimar-Eisenach
Reichswehr personnel
German Army generals of World War II